The imperial shag or imperial cormorant (Leucocarbo atriceps) is a black and white cormorant native to southern South America, primarily in rocky coastal regions, but locally also at large inland lakes. Some taxonomic authorities, including the International Ornithologists' Union, place it in the genus Leucocarbo, others in the genus Phalacrocorax. It is also known as the blue-eyed shag, blue-eyed cormorant and by many other names, and is one of a larger group of cormorants called blue-eyed shags. The taxonomy is very complex, and several former subspecies are often considered separate species.

Taxonomy
The taxonomy is very complex and species-limits within this group remain unresolved. Some taxonomic authorities, including the International Ornithologists' Union, split the group into the species listed below. Others consider the all or part of the group conspecific. The following are considered part of this group:

 Imperial shag, Leucocarbo (atriceps) atriceps, from coastal southern Chile and Argentina.
 King cormorant/white-bellied shag, Leucocarbo (atriceps) albiventer, from the Falkland Islands, and locally in southern Argentina and Chile.
 Antarctic shag, Leucocarbo (atriceps) bransfieldensis, from the Antarctic Peninsula and the South Shetland Islands.
 South Georgia shag, Leucocarbo (atriceps) georgianus, from the South Georgia and the South Sandwich Islands, and South Orkney Islands.
 Heard Island shag, Leucocarbo (atriceps) nivalis, from Heard Island.
 Crozet shag, Leucocarbo (atriceps) melanogenis, from the Crozet and Prince Edward Islands.
 Macquarie shag, Leucocarbo (atriceps) purpurascens, from Macquarie Island.

While some authorities consider all of the above – except albiventer – as separate species, others consider all as subspecies of a single species (as done in this article). Alternatively, some recognize two species, the white-cheeked L. atriceps (with subspecies bransfieldensis, nivalis and georgianus) and the black-cheeked L. albiventer (with subspecies melanogenis and purpurascens), or it has been suggested that three species should be recognized: L. atriceps (including albiventer), L. georgianus (with subspecies bransfieldensis and nivalis), and L. melanogenis (with subspecies purpurascens and possibly verrucosus, though the latter is relatively distinctive, and most consider it a separate species, the Kerguelen shag).

Description

It is endowed with glossy black feathers covering most of its body, with a white belly and neck. It possesses a distinctive ring of blue skin around its eyes, an orange-yellow nasal knob, pinkish legs and feet, and an erectile black crest. During the non-breeding season, adults lack the crest, have a duller facial area, and less/no white to the back/wings. It has a serrated bill used for catching fish.

The group varies primarily in the amount of white on the cheeks/ear-coverts, wing-coverts and back. Most taxa have white cheeks and ear-coverts, but these are black in albiventer, purpurascens and melanogenis. Chicks are uniform brownish, and immatures are brownish and white (instead of black and white), have dull facial skin, and lack the orange-yellow nasal knob and blue eye-ring.

Behavior

Breeding

This is a colonial, monogamous species. The colonies are usually relatively small, but some consist of hundreds of pairs and are often shared with other seabirds such as rock shags, southern rockhopper penguins and black-browed albatrosses. Up to five eggs (usually two or three) are placed in a nest made of seaweed and grass, and cemented together with mud and excrement. The eggs usually hatch in about five weeks, and are brooded by both parents. Many chicks and eggs are lost to predators such as skuas and sheathbills.

Feeding
The diet of this species consists of small benthic fish, crustaceans, polychaetes, gastropods and octopuses. They primarily feed on fish, especially Argentine anchoita,. Most feeding takes place in inshore regions, but at least some populations will travel some distance from the shore to fish.

Status
Overall this species is not considered threatened and is consequently listed as Least Concern by BirdLife International and IUCN. Most subspecies are relatively common with estimates of over 10,000 pairs of each

Notes

References

imperial shag
Birds of the Falkland Islands
Birds of Patagonia
Fauna of Temperate South America
imperial shag